Tallentire is a village and former civil parish, now in the parish of Bridekirk, in the Allerdale borough of Cumbria, England. The village is located just outside the Lake District National Park. In 1931 the parish had a population of 184.

Etymology
The name Tallentire is one of Brittonic origins. The first element tāl means "brow, front, end", and the terminal element *tīr means "land" (Welsh tâl and tir). Unusually, "Tallentire" appears to contain a definite article in the form of -en, leading to the proposition that *[h]ïn was a definite article in the Brittonic of the North, although ï[r] (Welsh y; see Penyghent, Penicuik) is considerably more common. The meaning of the name may be "end of the land".

Governance
Tallentire is part of the Workington constituency for UK parliament. The current Member of Parliament for the Workington constituency is Mark Jenkinson, who is a member of the Conservative Party. Until the 2019 election the Labour Party had won the seat in the constituency in every general election since 1979. The Conservative Party had previously only been elected once in Workington since World War II, at the 1976 Workington by-election.

The village is in the Broughton St Bridget's electoral ward of Allerdale Borough Council. This ward stretches north to Bridekirk with a total population at the 2011 Census of 4,178. Tallentire is part of the Dearham and Broughton Ward of Cumbria County Council.
	
Tallentire was formerly a township in Bridekirk parish, from 1866 Tallentire was a civil parish in its own right until it was abolished on 1 April 1934 and merged with Bridekirk.

References

External links
 Cumbria County History Trust: Tallentire (nb: provisional research only – see Talk page)

Villages in Cumbria
Former civil parishes in Cumbria
Bridekirk